"Surround Yourself with Sorrow" is a song recorded by the English pop singer Cilla Black, which was released as a single and on the album Surround Yourself with Cilla in 1969. The song spent 12 weeks on the UK Singles Chart, peaking at No. 3, while reaching No. 5 on the Irish Singles Chart, No. 5 on the New Zealand Listener chart, No. 5 in Poland, No. 6 in Singapore, and No. 22 on Australia's Go-Set chart.

A cover in Swedish, "Försök och sov på saken" was made by Anni-Frid Lyngstad in 1969 (Columbia DS 2438.

Chart performance

References

1969 songs
1969 singles
Cilla Black songs
Songs written by Bill Martin (songwriter)
Songs written by Phil Coulter
Parlophone singles
Song recordings produced by George Martin